Devan Austin Tanton Pedraza (born 3 January 2004) is a professional footballer who plays as a defender for Fulham. Born in the United States, he is a youth international for Colombia.

Club career
Born in San Antonio, Texas to an American father and Colombian mother, Tanton was raised in Orlando, Florida, where he joined the FC Elite Academy at the age of eight. A year later, while at a Barcelona Academy camp in Florida, he was scouted and invited to sign for Spanish side Cornellà.

While playing for the United States in an under-17 game against England at the St George's Park National Football Centre, he was scouted by Fulham, who he went on to sign for in January 2021.

In September 2022, he was loaned to Isthmian League side Walton & Hersham until January 2023. He went on to make eight appearances in all competitions for The Swans, before returning to Fulham.

International career
Tanton initially represented the United States at under-15 and under-17 level, receiving his first call up to the latter in February 2020.

He switched his allegiance to Colombia in September 2022, getting an assist on his debut for the under-20 side in a 4–0 win against the Dominican Republic. He followed this up with an appearances in a friendly against Ecuador in November 2022.

Career statistics

References

2004 births
Living people
Soccer players from San Antonio
Soccer players from Texas
Colombian footballers
Colombia youth international footballers
American soccer players
United States men's youth international soccer players
Colombian people of American descent
American people of Colombian descent
Association football defenders
UE Cornellà players
Fulham F.C. players
Walton & Hersham F.C. players
American expatriate soccer players
Colombian expatriate footballers
American expatriate sportspeople in Spain
Colombian expatriate sportspeople in Spain
Expatriate footballers in Spain
American expatriate sportspeople in England
Colombian expatriate sportspeople in England
Expatriate footballers in England